Solapur District (Marathi pronunciation: [solaːpuːɾ]) is a district in Maharashtra state of India. The city of Solapur is the district headquarters. It is located on the south east edge of the state and lies entirely in the Bhima and Seena basins. The entire district is drained by the Bhima River.

Solapur district leads Maharashtra in production of Indian cigarettes known as beedi.

Officer

Members of Parliament
Jaisidhesvar Swami (BJP) 
Ranjit Naik-Nimbalkar (BJP) 
Omraje Nimbalkar SHS(UBT)

Guardian Minister

list of Guardian Minister

District Magistrate/Collector

list of District Magistrate / Collector

Demographics

According to the 2011 census Solapur District has a population of 4,317,756, the 43rd largest district in India by population (out of 640). Its population growth rate over the decade 2001-2011 was 12.1%. Solapur has a sex ratio of 932 females for every 1000 males, and a literacy rate of 77.72%. Scheduled Castes and Scheduled Tribes make up 15.05% and 1.80% of the population respectively.

At the time of the 2011 Census of India, 73.13% of the population in the district spoke Marathi, 9.28% Kannada, 6.47% Hindi, 4.49% Telugu, 3.94% Urdu and 0.94% Lambadi as their first language.

Talukas
Solapur district is subdivided for administrative purposes into eleven talukas, which in turn comprise smaller divisions. The talukas are North Solapur, South Solapur, Akkalkot, Barshi, Mangalwedha, Pandharpur, Sangola, Malshiras, Mohol, Madha and Karmala.

Notable people
 M. F. Husain - painter
 Shashikala - Hindi film actress
 Sarala Yeolekar - Marathi film actress
 Lalchand Hirachand (Industrialist)
 Yusufkhan Mohamadkhan Pathan (Scholar)
 Jabbar Patel - Marathi film director
 Atul Kulkarni - Marathi and Hindi film actor
 Nagraj Manjule  - Marathi film director
 Rinku Rajguru - Marathi film actress
 Akash Thosar  - Marathi film actor
 Ranjitsinh Disale - Teacher, Winner of Global Teacher Prize 2020

See also
Nandnee

References

External links

Official website of Solapur District

 
Districts of Maharashtra
Pune division